Greene Farmer Jr. (September 8, 1919 –  May 20, 1982) was an American baseball outfielder in the Negro leagues. He played from 1942 to 1947 with the New York Black Yankees, Cincinnati/Indianapolis Clowns, and New York Cubans.

References

External links
 and Seamheads

New York Black Yankees players
Indianapolis Clowns players
New York Cubans players
1919 births
1982 deaths
20th-century African-American sportspeople
Baseball outfielders